The 1961 Cal Poly Pomona Broncos football team represented the Cal Poly Kellogg-Voorhis Unit—now known as California State Polytechnic University, Pomona—as an independent during the 1961 NCAA College Division football season. Led by fifth-year head coach Don Warhurst, Cal Poly Pomona compiled a record of 6–3. The team outscored its opponents 258 to 147 for the season. The Broncos played home games at L.A. State Stadium in Los Angeles.

Schedule

Notes

References

Cal Poly Pomona
Cal Poly Pomona Broncos football seasons
Cal Poly Pomona Broncos football